The wedding of Prince Edward, Duke of Kent, and Katharine Worsley took place on Thursday, 8 June 1961, at York Minster in York, England. Prince Edward, Duke of Kent, was the eldest son of Prince George, Duke of Kent, and Princess Marina of Greece and Denmark, while Katharine Worsley was the only daughter and fourth child of landowner Sir William Worsley, 4th Baronet.

Engagement
The Duke of Kent met Miss Katherine Worsley, daughter of Sir William Worsley, 4th Baronet, while he was based at Catterick Garrison near the bride's family's ancestral home, Hovingham Hall.

The engagement of the Duke of Kent to Miss Katharine Worsley was announced on 8 March 1961 at Kensington Palace. The Duke presented Miss Worsley with an engagement ring made of an oval sapphire with round diamonds on either side.

Wedding

The couple were married by The Most Rev. and Rt Hon. Michael Ramsey, Archbishop of York, in York Minster, the "Westminster Abbey of the North," according to the Book of Common Prayer. This was the first royal wedding held in York Minster since Edward III married Philippa of Hainault in 1328.

Following the service, the couple and their guests returned to the bride's family home, Hovingham Hall, for the wedding breakfast. The newlyweds then departed for their honeymoon at Birkhall on the Balmoral estate.

Music
The bride walked down the aisle to the hymn "O Praise Ye the Lord! Sing Praise in the Height" to the tune Laudate Dominum by Sir Hubert Parry. The newlywed couple recessed to Widor's "Toccata" from Symphony for Organ No. 5.

Attire
The bride's wedding dress, designed by John Cavanagh on the recommendation of her future mother-in-law, was made of 237 yards of French-made diaphanous white silk gauze. It featured a tight bodice, stiff neckline, and a full skirt with a 15-foot double train. She anchored her white tulle veil with a diamond bandeau tiara which belonged to the bridegroom's late grandmother, Queen Mary.

The Duke wore the uniform of his regiment, the Royal Scots Greys with the riband of the Royal Victorian Order.

Attendants
The bridegroom was supported by his brother, Prince Michael. The bride was attended by eight bridesmaids and three page boys: 
 The Princess Anne, daughter of The Queen and The Duke of Edinburgh, thus a paternal first cousin once removed (maternal second cousin) of the groom
 The Hon. Jane Spencer, daughter of Viscount and Viscountess Althorp
 Sandra Butter, daughter of Major and Mrs David Butter
 Joanna FitzRoy, daughter of Lord and Lady Edward FitzRoy
 Willa Worsley, daughter of The Hon. Carolyn and Mr John Worsley, thus a niece of the bride
 Diana Worsley, daughter of Mr and Mrs Edward Worsley, thus a paternal first cousin of the bride
 Katherine Ashley-Cooper
 Emily Briggs 
 William Worsley, son of Mr and Mrs Marcus Worsley, thus a nephew of the bride
 Edward Beckett, son of Lady Elizabeth and The Hon. Christopher Beckett
 Simon Hay, son of Lady Margaret and Sir Philip Hay

Guests
Notable guests in attendance included:

Relatives of the groom
 The Duchess of Kent, the groom's mother
 Princess Alexandra of Kent, the groom's sister
 Prince Michael of Kent, the groom's brother
 Queen Elizabeth The Queen Mother, the groom's paternal aunt by marriage
 The Queen and The Duke of Edinburgh, the groom's paternal first cousin and maternal first cousin once removed
 The Prince of Wales, the groom's paternal first cousin once removed
 The Princess Anne, the groom's paternal first cousin once removed (bridesmaid)
 The Princess Margaret, Mrs. Armstrong-Jones and Mr Antony Armstrong-Jones, the groom's paternal first cousin and her husband
 The Princess Royal, the groom's paternal aunt
 The Earl and Countess of Harewood, the groom's paternal first cousin and his wife
 The Duke and Duchess of Gloucester, the groom's paternal uncle and aunt
 Prince William of Gloucester, the groom's paternal first cousin
 Lady Patricia and The Hon. Sir Alexander Ramsay, the groom's paternal first cousin twice removed and her husband
 Princess Alice, Countess of Athlone, the groom's first cousin twice removed and paternal grandaunt by marriage
 The Earl Mountbatten of Burma, the groom's second cousin once removed
 The Lady and Lord Brabourne, the groom's third cousin and her husband
 Lady Pamela and Mr David Nightingale Hicks, the groom's third cousin and her husband

Relatives of the bride
 Sir William and Lady Worsley, the bride's parents
 Mr and Mrs Marcus Worsley, the bride's brother and sister-in-law
 Master William Worsley, the bride's nephew
 Mr Oliver Worsley, the bride's brother
 Mr and Mrs John Worsley, the bride's brother and sister-in-law
 Miss Willa Worsley, the bride's niece

Other royal guests

Members of reigning royal houses
  The Crown Prince of Norway, the groom's paternal second cousin 
  Princess Irene of the Netherlands, the groom's maternal third cousin 
  Princess Margrethe of Denmark, the groom's paternal and maternal third cousin
  Prince and Princess Georg of Denmark, the groom's first cousin twice removed and his wife
  The Crown Prince of Greece, the groom's maternal second cousin 
  Princess Sophia of Greece and Denmark, the groom's maternal second cousin
  Princess Eugénie, Duchess of Castel Duino, the groom's maternal first cousin once removed

Members of non-reigning royal houses
 Queen Victoria Eugenie of Spain, the groom's paternal first cousin twice removed
 The Count of Barcelona, the groom's paternal second cousin once removed
 The Prince of Asturias, the groom's paternal third cousin
 Princess and Prince Paul of Yugoslavia the groom's maternal aunt and uncle
 Prince and Princess Alexander of Yugoslavia, the groom's maternal first cousin and his wife
 The Princess of Hohenlohe-Langenburg, the groom's maternal first cousin once removed

It was at this wedding that Infante Juan Carlos of Spain became better acquainted with Princess Sophia of Greece and Denmark. The pair would marry the following year and accede to the Spanish throne in 1975.

Other notable guests
 Mr and Mrs Douglas Fairbanks Jr.
 Mr Noël Coward

References

Edward, Duke of Kent, and Katharine Worsley
1960s in Yorkshire
June 1961 events in the United Kingdom
Edward, Duke of Kent, and Katharine Worsley